Tatjana Maria (née Malek; born 8 August 1987) is a German professional tennis player. In November 2017, she reached her best singles ranking of world No. 46, and in June 2016, she peaked at No. 54 in the doubles rankings.
She has won two singles titles and four doubles titles on the WTA Tour, as well as 16 singles and 15 doubles titles on the ITF Circuit. She has made twelve appearances (18 matches) for Germany in Fed Cup competition between 2006 and 2011 and between 2018 and 2020.

Career

2013–2016: Wimbledon & Miami Open third rounds, top 100 debut
Maria took a sabbatical in 2013, to have her first child, and returned to tour at the 2014 Copa Colsanitas.

2017–2020: Top 50, first WTA title
She reached a career-high ranking in the top 50 in November 2017. Maria won her first singles WTA Tour title at the 2018 Mallorca Open.

2022: First Major semifinal at Wimbledon

She won her second title at the 2022 Copa Colsanitas.

At the Wimbledon Championships, she won in the third round against world No. 5, Maria Sakkari (her fifth top 10 win), and in the round of 16 against 12th-seeded Jeļena Ostapenko, where she saved two match points. This made her the oldest player to debut in a Wimbledon quarterfinal. In the quarterfinal, she beat compatriot Jule Niemeier who was ranked 97th, in three sets. She reached a Wimbledon semifinal as the sixth female player in the Open Era over the age of 34, and the sixth woman from Germany. She lost her semifinal match to the second seed and world No. 2, Ons Jabeur, in three sets. She was the first mother-of-two to make the last four of a major since Margaret Court at Wimbledon 1975, and only the fourth player ranked outside the top 100 to reach the Wimbledon semifinals. She was named the WTA Comeback Player of the Year for her performance in 2022.

Personal life
Her father Heinrich Malek was a Polish international handball player originally from Zabrze.

On 8 April 2013, she married her coach, the French former tennis player Charles-Edouard Maria. Their first child, a daughter named Charlotte, was born on 20 December 2013, and their second daughter, Cecilia, was born on 2 April 2021.

Performance timelines

Only main-draw results in WTA Tour, Grand Slam tournaments, Fed Cup/Billie Jean King Cup and Olympic Games are included in win–loss records.

Singles
Current through the 2023 Indian Wells Open.

Doubles

WTA career finals

Singles: 2 (2 titles)

Doubles: 8 (4 titles, 4 runner-ups)

WTA Challenger finals

Doubles: 1 (1 runner–up)

ITF Circuit finals

Singles: 30 (17 titles, 13 runner–ups)

Doubles: 25 (15 titles, 10 runner–ups)

Record against top-10 players
Maria's record against players who have been ranked in the top 10. Active players are in boldface.

 .

Wins over top-10 players
Maria has a  record against players who were, at the time the match was played, ranked in the top 10.

Billie Jean King Cup performance 

Note: Levels of Billie Jean King Cup in which Germany did not participate in a particular year are marked "NP".

Notes

References

External links

 
 
 
 

1987 births
Living people
People from Bad Saulgau
Sportspeople from Tübingen (region)
German female tennis players
German people of Polish descent
Tennis people from Baden-Württemberg